, is a multimedia franchise celebrating the 20th anniversary of the Animax channel. An anime television series ran from October 1 to December 17, 2018. The project also includes a free-to-play mobile game that was launched on October 15, 2018 and shut down on January 31, 2019.

Plot
The series follows five girls who discover a way to travel to parallel universes using a radio. As they visit several universes, they discover that a cosmic force known only as the "Twilight" is invading and destroying the universes. One by one, they start to transform into magical girls called "Equalizers", and find themselves drawn into the war against the Twilight.

Characters

Media

Anime

Animax announced the project on March 22, 2018, as a celebration of the channel's 20th anniversary. The anime television series is directed by Jin Tamamura and Yūichi Abe and written by Shogo Yasukawa, based on a concept by Kotaro Uchikoshi. Hiroshi Yamamoto is credited for writing the series' "SF setting". The series is animated by Dandelion Animation Studio and Jūmonji. Character designs are provided by Masakazu Katsura and Hiroyuki Asada, who also serves as the series' concept artist. Hiroki Harada is adapting the character designs for animation. Akitomo Yamamoto, Koji Watanabe, and Yuki Kawashima serve as sub-character designers, with Yamamoto also serving as chief animation director. Susumu Imaishi, Koji Watanabe, and Sayaka Takase provide prop designs for the series, and Ryō Hirata and Yasuhiro Moriki also provide designs. Yusa Itō serves as art director at Kusanagi, while Haruko Nobori is the color key artist, Stanislas Brunet produces the imageboard art, and Akihiro Hirasawa is in charge of art setting. Atsushi Satou serves as the director of photography at Studio Shamrock. Hideaki Takeda produces the series' 3DCG, and Hiroto Morishita serves as sound director. The series is edited by Mai Hasegawa.

Ryu produced the series' music, and Kenji Itō composed the main theme song. The opening theme song, is performed by Michi, and the ending theme song is a cover of Hideaki Tokunaga's song , performed by Ami Wajima.

The series ran from October 1 to December 17, 2018, for 12 episodes and was broadcast on Animax, Tokyo MX, and YTV. It is also available on multiple streaming services. Sentai Filmworks has licensed the series and is streaming it on Hidive. MVM Entertainment have acquired the series for distribution via Sentai Filmworks in the UK and Ireland.

Episode list

Game
The project also includes a free-to-play mobile game tie-in. The game shares the same writer, character designer, concept artist, composer, and main theme songwriter as the anime. The game was released on iOS and Android. The game's service closed on January 31, 2019, although an offline version retaining some features was then made available.

Reception

Previews
The anime series' first episode garnered mixed reviews from Anime News Network's staff during the Fall 2018 season previews. Nick Creamer was impressed by the script's "grace of dialogue and characterization" during the introduction of Asuka and her friends, and the Land of the Lustrous-esque fight choreography but felt the story was "mostly just functional", saying it "demonstrates promise in a variety of ways." James Beckett praised the Radio Research society concept and its slice-of-life aura in the first half but was put off by the second half when the cast shrugged off their supernatural encounter and downplayed its overall mystery, saying that it's worth checking out a few more episodes to see more potential in the premise and tell a captivating story. Theron Martin gave praise to the "mostly solid" technical merits and was intrigued by the multiple dimensions concept and meeting alternate versions of Asuka but was critical of her ensemble being made up of "standard girl-group personality archetypes", concluding with: "Basically, this isn't a knock-your-socks-off kind of debut, but it's just good and intriguing enough to merit a mild recommendation." Paul Jensen commended the conversation between both Asukas towards the end but was conflicted over the ensemble cast and its supposed camaraderie with each other and the alternate world visuals having a vibrant color palette but a poor CG action scene, concluding that: "As it stands, this episode is just intriguing enough to merit sticking around for a week or two, if only to find out what the heck is going on." Rebecca Silverman criticized the tryhard attempts at being "interesting and quirky" with its ideas feeling unnatural and the female cast having sparse characterizations but gave praise to "the contrasts between the two Asukas" and the missing little brother mystery. She concluded that: "I'm not quite intrigued enough to say that I'll definitely be giving this a second episode, but it does seem like it will be worth catching up with further down the line. If it can get past its too-obvious attempts to stand out, the story itself may make this worthwhile all on its own."

Series reception
Martin reviewed the complete anime series in 2019 and gave it an overall B grade. He felt the story had a "fairly standard plot construction" and was "heavy-handed" with its subject matter throughout the various world designs but gave it praise for allowing the cast to have "decent character growth" as the series progressed, solid artistic efforts in the other worlds and its use of CG and Tomoyo Kurosawa's performance as the different versions of Asuka. He concluded that "the season's late episodes bring together the balance of serious and goofy story elements well enough for the story to be effective as a tale of personal growth." Allen Moody, writing for THEM Anime Reviews, was positive towards the story of each girl confronting their personal issues in an alternate world but felt it was undercut by "ludicrous showdowns" with "CG-animated magical/mecha girl transformations" and action sequences.

Explanatory notes

References

External links
  
 

Android (operating system) games
Animax original programming
Anime and manga about parallel universes
Free-to-play video games
IOS games
Magical girl anime and manga
Masakazu Katsura
Sentai Filmworks
Sony Pictures Entertainment Japan franchises
Video games about parallel universes
Video games based on anime and manga
Video games developed in Japan